The 30-pounder short gun was a piece of artillery mounted on French warships of the Age of sail. They were the middle-sized component of the unified system standardised on the 30-pounder calibre, replacing both the 24-pounders and 18-pounders in many usages.

Usage 
The 30-pounder short gun was installed on the lower deck on frigates and on the middle deck of three-deckers, the main battery being armed with 30-pounder long guns and the upper deck, with 30-pounder carronades.

History 
In the wake of the Napoleonic Wars, the Navy undertook a number of reforms, most notably a reform in the artillery system. In contrast with the 1788 system, where large warships armed their main batteries with large 36-pounder long guns and upper deck with smaller long guns using smaller shots, it was decided to standardise on the 30-pound calibre, and deploy a variety of guns of different weights, as not to overload the tops. The differences in weight were obtained by fielding a large 30-pounder long gun, a shorter 30-pounder with a thinner barrel, and a 30-pounder carronade.

This allowed a much simplified handling of ammunition, and significantly increased the broadsides of warships. A first-rank 60-gun frigate of the 1840s thus armed had a heavier broadside than a 74-gun ship of the line of the 1780s.

Sources and references

References

Bibliography 
 

Naval guns of France
164 mm artillery